Validamycin is an antibiotic and fungicide produced by Streptomyces hygroscopicus. It is used as an inhibitor of trehalase.  It is used for the control of sheath blight of rice and damping-off  of cucumbers.

See also
Ralstonia solanacearum

References 

Amino sugars
Oligosaccharides
Cyclitols
Antibiotics
Fungicides
Cyclohexenes